Morgan County Courthouse may refer to:

 Morgan County Courthouse and Jail, Fort Morgan, Colorado, listed on the National Register of Historic Places (NRHP)
 Morgan County Courthouse (Georgia), Madison, Georgia
 Morgan County Courthouse (Illinois), Jacksonville, Illinois
 Morgan County Courthouse (Indiana), Martinsville, Indiana
 Morgan County Courthouse (Kentucky), West Liberty, Kentucky
 Morgan County Courthouse (Missouri), Versailles, Missouri
 Morgan County Courthouse (Ohio), McConnelsville, Ohio
 Morgan County Courthouse (West Virginia), Berkeley Springs, West Virginia